The Southern Railway E1/R is a class of 0-6-2T tank steam locomotive designed for light passenger and freight duties. They were rebuilt from earlier LB&SCR E1 class 0-6-0T locomotives originally built 1874–1883. The rebuilt locomotives were intended to be used in the West of England.

Construction
In 1927, there was a surplus of the Stroudley ‘E’ tanks in service on the Central Section of the Southern Railway, many of which were in good condition as they had been fitted with larger boilers by D. E. Marsh after 1911. At the same time there was a need for additional tank locomotives in the Western Section for use in shunting, station piloting and particularly for services on the North Cornwall line to Padstow.

Ten locomotives had their frames extended, bunkers and water tanks enlarged at Brighton works over the next two years. A pony truck of the same design as a ’N’ class locomotive was also added to create a radial trailing axle, making them 0-6-2T. The rebuilt locomotives were dispatched to the Western section during 1928 and 1929 and found to be successful. Some complaints from passengers about rough riding on the meandering North Cornwall line were addressed by having the locomotives on this line re-balanced during 1936 while other locomotives that weren't balanced were restricted to local and shunting and banking duties.

The new class performed well for nearly twenty years but withdrawal commenced in 1955 and they were finally all replaced by Ivatt's prairie tanks by 1959.

References 

 
 The London, Brighton & South Coast Railway web site - www.lbscr.org.uk
 ABC of British Locomotives 1948
 Observer's Book of Railway Locomotives of Great Britain 1958

E1 R
0-6-2T locomotives
Railway locomotives introduced in 1927